Paul Mars Black (born Paul Marmorstein; March 17, 1959) is an American singer and drummer. He is most notable for his time as lead vocalist in L.A. Guns, with whom he wrote most of their self-titled debut album.

Early life and career
Born in San Francisco, California, Black's roots were in bluegrass. In the 1970s, his high school rock band was called Your Mother. He also played in several jazz cover bands. In 1978, he was a percussion major at San Jose State University.

Black moved to Los Angeles in May 1980, still using his given name, Paul Martin Marmorstein. His first L.A. band was Mad Captions who played CBGB in New York and The Hot Club in Philadelphia with The Dead Boys. In 1981, Paul joined The Mau-Mau's, a Los Angeles-based punk band which was fronted by Rick Wilder of The Berlin Brats. During Paul's time with The Mau-Mau's, he shortened his name to "Paul Mars." Paul played drums for a Mau-Mau's record produced by Robbie Krieger of The Doors which was never released. In 1984, Paul Mars Joined The Joneses and recorded the drums for Keeping Up With The Joneses.

L.A. Guns

Black began putting together a side project for his songs to be called "Faster Pussycat" with guitarist Mick Cripps. Black switched to lead vocals, Cripps switched to bass, and the two joined guitarist Tracii Guns and drummer Nickey "Beat" Alexander and later on guitarist Robert Stoddard to complete this line-up.

The name was switched to L.A. Guns because the owner of the name, Raz Cue, offered to back the band if this line-up would re-use L.A. Guns, a name which had been abandoned over a year prior by a former band of Guns's (Guns N' Roses). Black changed his name again to Paul Black. From 1985 to March 1987, Paul Black wrote and co-wrote a number of songs, which led L.A. Guns to a record deal with Polygram Records. However, Black left before the record was finished and before the deal was signed. Black was replaced by Phil Lewis.

After leaving L.A. Guns, Black formed Black Cherry, which quickly became one of the most popular and sought after bands in L.A. But, a lawsuit filed by Black against his former band L.A. Guns and Polygram Records kept Black Cherry from signing a deal. Black retired in 1993 and seldom played shows. In 2000, Black wrote and recorded an album with Jo Almeida of Dogs D'Amour called Jo & Paul's Sonic Boom, Sun Down And Yellow Moon.

Two compilation albums featuring unreleased archive material of Black singing with L.A. Guns, Black City Breakdown (1985-1986) and Black List, as well as Sun Down And Yellow Moon from Jo & Paul's Sonic Boom, were released on his own label Black City Records.

From 2006 to 2008, he was the lead singer of Tracii Guns's L.A. Guns, a spinoff band that existed at the same time as Phil Lewis' L.A. Guns.

Discography

With Jo & Paul's Sonic Boom
Sun Down And Yellow Moon (2000)

With L.A. Guns
Black City Breakdown (1985–1986) (2000)
Black List (2005)

The Joneses
 Keeping Up With... (1986)

References

External links
 
 Paul Black interview (October 9, 2008) at Sleaze Roxx
 Paul Black interview (December 2006) at Saviours Of Rock

American male singers
American rock singers
Glam metal musicians
L.A. Guns members
Living people
1959 births
Singers from San Francisco
Drummers from San Francisco
20th-century American drummers
American male drummers
20th-century American male musicians